Ukala (Ang Walang Suko), meaning "Ukala (The Unrelenting)" [i.e. the one who doesn't give up] was a comic strip title in Philippine comics. The main character in the comic book story is Ukala. Ukala was created in the 1950s by distinguished Filipino illustrator Alfredo Alcala. Ukala, the character, was a Native American Indian or "Amerindian". The story, written and illustrated by Alcala for Filipino readers, was about the adventures of Native American Indians set at a timeline when the first Europeans arrived in the Northwestern region of the Americas. Ukala was adapted into film as Ukala (Ang Walang Takot), meaning "Ukala (The Fearless)" in the Tagalog language. It appeared on the pages of the Philippine comic book named Pilipino Komiks.
It had been made into movie by Sampaguita Pictures, directed by Artemio B. Tecson in 1954. Leading performers were Cesar Ramirez in the title role and Alicia Vergel as Margarita.

Collected editions

See also

 Voltar

References

External links
 Sample comic book cover for Ukala (Ang Walang Suko), 1950s, Alcala Legacy Milestone of the Master

Philippine comic strips
1950 comics debuts
Comics characters introduced in 1950
Fictional Native American people
Native Americans in popular culture
Male characters in comics
Comics set in the 17th century
Philippine comics adapted into films
Filipino comics characters